The cackling goose (Branta hutchinsii) is a species of goose found in North America.

Systematics
The genus name Branta is a Latinised form of Old Norse Brandgás, "burnt (black) goose", and the specific epithet hutchinsii commemorates English surgeon Thomas Hutchins who was employed by the Hudson's Bay Company.

The cackling goose was originally considered to be the same species or a subspecies of the Canada goose, but in July 2004 the American Ornithologists' Union's (AOU) Committee on Classification and Nomenclature split the two into two species, making cackling goose into a full species with the scientific name Branta hutchinsii. The British Ornithologists' Union (BOU) followed suit in June 2005.

The AOU has divided the many associated subspecies between both animals. To the present species were assigned:

Richardson's cackling goose (B. h. hutchinsii)
Aleutian cackling goose (B. h. leucopareia)
Small cackling goose (B. h. minima)
Taverner's cackling goose (B. h. taverneri)
†Bering cackling goose (B. h. asiatica)—doubtfully distinct from B. h. leucopareia; extinct (c.1929)

The distinctions between the two geese have led to a great deal of confusion and debate among ornithologists. This has been aggravated by the overlap between the small types of Canada goose and larger types of cackling goose. The old "lesser Canada geese" were believed to be a partly hybrid population, with the birds named taverneri considered a mixture of minima with subspecies occidentalis and parvipes, which today remain with the Canada goose proper. Actually however, taverneri is one of the larger subspecies of cackling geese. In addition, it has been determined that the barnacle goose (B. leucopsis) is a derivative of the cackling goose lineage, whereas the Hawaiian goose (B. sandvicensis) is an insular representative of the Canada goose.

In the wake of the discussion generated by the official standalone species designation, introduced by the AOU and BOU in 2004 and 2005, Harold C. Hanson published a paper in 2007 suggesting that Canada and cackling geese should be split into six species and 200 subspecies. The radical nature of this proposal provoked surprise, with Richard Banks of the AOU urging caution before any of Hanson's proposals be accepted. No further redesignation has been introduced by either of these Ornithologists' Unions.

Description
The black head and neck with white "chinstrap" distinguish this goose from all other geese except the larger Canada goose (Branta canadensis) and the similarly sized barnacle goose (B. leucopsis). There are up to 5 subspecies of cackling goose of varying sizes and plumage details. The female looks virtually identical but is slightly lighter and has a different voice. Some are hard to distinguish from the Canada goose, with which the cackling goose was long assumed to form one species, the cackling goose and the smaller Canada goose subspecies being called the lesser Canada goose. The distinctness of the extinct population of the Komandorski and Kuril Islands B. h. asiatica is controversial. The barnacle goose differs in having a black breast and grey, rather than brownish, body plumage.

Measurements:

 Length: 
 Weight: 
 Wingspan:

Range
This species is native to North America. It breeds in northern Canada and Alaska in a variety of tundra habitats. However, the nest is usually located in an elevated area near water. The eggs are laid in a shallow depression lined with plant material and down. Males can be very aggressive in defending territory. A pair may mate for life (up to around 20 years). Adult geese are often seen leading their goslings in a line with one parent at the front, and the other at the back of the "parade".

Like most geese, it is naturally migratory, the wintering range being most of the U.S., and locally in western Canada and northern Mexico. The calls overhead from large groups of cackling geese flying in V-shaped formation signal the transitions into spring and fall. In some areas, migration routes have changed due to changes in habitat and food sources.

Cackling geese have occasionally reached western Europe naturally, as has been proved by ringing recoveries. The birds are of at least the subspecies hutchinsii, and possibly others. Cackling geese are also found naturally on occasions in the Kamchatka Peninsula in eastern Siberia, eastern China, and throughout Japan. Despite this, the IUCN considers it extirpated from Japan, where it previously had an established non breeding (winter) population.

Feeding
These birds feed mainly on plant material. When feeding in water, they submerge their heads and necks to reach aquatic plants, sometimes tipping forward like a dabbling duck. Flocks of these birds often feed on leftover cultivated grains in fields, especially during migration or in winter. They also eat some insects, molluscs and crustaceans.

Status
By the early 20th century, over-hunting and loss of habitat in the late 19th and early 20th centuries had resulted in a serious decline in the numbers of this bird in its native range. With improved game laws and habitat restoration and preservation programs, their populations have recovered in most of their range, although some local populations may still be declining, especially of the subspecies minima and leucopareia. Though the taxonomic distinctness of the Komandorski and Kuril Islands populations, which used to winter in Japan, is controversial, it is without doubt that they disappeared around 1929.

References

Further reading
Stackhouse, Mark. The New Goose.
Angus, Wilson. Identification and range of subspecies within the Canada and Cackling Goose Complex (Branta canadensis & B. hutchinsii).
Moser, Timothy J., Craven, Scott R. and Miller, Brian K. Canada Geese in the Mississippi Flyway: A Guide for Goose Hunters and Goose Watchers.
Martin Garner Focus On: 'white-cheeked' geese.

External links

 
 Cackling Goose – Cornell Lab of Ornithology

cackling goose
cackling goose
Native birds of Alaska
Birds of Canada
cackling goose
cackling goose